CJD can mean:

 Chojoongdong, South Korean newspaper
 Christliches Jugenddorfwerk Deutschlands, German Christian educational institution
 Creutzfeldt–Jakob disease, rare disease of the brain caused by prions
 Candilejas Airport, Colombia (by IATA code)